The Tabriz–Ankara pipeline is a  long natural gas pipeline, which runs from Tabriz in north-west Iran to Ankara in Turkey.

History
The construction of pipeline started in 1996 after signing a gas deal between Turkish and Iranian governments. The gas deal was signed on 30 August 1996. The pipeline was commissioned in July 2001.

The Iran-Turkey pipeline has allegedly been blown up several times by PKK fighters. In January 2008 gas supplies were stopped because of cut-off gas supplies from Turkmenistan.  The supply was cut off again in February 2008 because of bad weather conditions.

Technical features
The Turkish section, operated by BOTAŞ, cost US$600 million. The pipeline capacity is 14 bcm per year: Turkish normally imports about 11 billion cubic meters of gas a year through the pipeline. Just before Ankara it is linked to Blue Stream.

Contracts 
Negotiations are in progress to renew the current 25 year contract, for nearly 10 bcm per year, which expires end-2025 according to the Middle East Economic Survey (or end-July 2026 according to the Oxford Institute for Energy Studies).

See also

Iran-Turkey relations

External links 

 Tabriz–Ankara pipeline on Global Energy Monitor

References

Energy infrastructure completed in 2001
Iran–Turkey relations
Natural gas pipelines in Iran
Natural gas pipelines in Turkey